The 1991–92 NBA season was the Detroit Pistons' 44th season in the National Basketball Association, and 35th season in the city of Detroit. During the off-season, the Pistons acquired Orlando Woolridge from the Denver Nuggets. The Pistons got off to a slow start with a 9–13 record, but managed to win 10 of their next 13 games. In December, during a road game against the Utah Jazz, Karl Malone committed a flagrant foul on Isiah Thomas, in which Malone hit Thomas's forehead with his elbow, and Thomas had to receive 40 stitches; Malone was suspended for one game. The Pistons held a 28–20 record at the All-Star break, and won seven consecutive games in March, then won six in a row in April, finishing third in the Central Division with a 48–34 record.

Joe Dumars led the team in scoring with 19.9 points per game, while Thomas averaged 18.5 points, 7.2 assists and 1.5 steals per game, and Dennis Rodman provided the team with 9.8 points, and led the league with 18.7 rebounds per game. In addition, Woolridge averaged 14.0 points per game, while sixth man Mark Aguirre provided with 11.3 points per game off the bench, Bill Laimbeer contributed 9.7 points and 5.6 rebounds per game, and John Salley provided with 9.5 points and 1.5 blocks per game. Dumars, Thomas and Rodman were all selected for the 1992 NBA All-Star Game, while Dumars and Rodman were both named to the NBA All-Defensive First Team, and Rodman was selected to the All-NBA Third Team. Rodman also finished in second place in Defensive Player of the Year voting. 

Throughout the season, speculation that it was Chuck Daly's last season as head coach of the Pistons lingered in the media, intensifying as the season went out and well into the playoffs. As the “Bad Boys” era was fading, the Pistons were eliminated in five games in the Eastern Conference First Round of the playoffs by the New York Knicks. The Pistons would not return to the playoffs until 1996. Following the season, Daly left to coach the New Jersey Nets, and Salley was traded to the Miami Heat. 

Meanwhile, the Bulls-Pistons rivalry took another ugly turn as Thomas was left off the Dream Team coached by Daly, reportedly at the request of Michael Jordan.

Draft picks

Roster

Regular season

Season standings

y - clinched division title
x - clinched playoff spot

z - clinched conference title
y - clinched division title
x - clinched playoff spot

Record vs. opponents

Game log

Playoffs

|- align="center" bgcolor="#ffcccc"
| 1
| April 24
| @ New York
| L 75–109
| Joe Dumars (13)
| John Salley (5)
| Joe Dumars (5)
| Madison Square Garden19,081
| 1–0
|- align="center" bgcolor="#ccffcc"
| 2
| April 26
| @ New York
| W 89–88
| Joe Dumars (21)
| Bill Laimbeer (12)
| Isiah Thomas (6)
| Madison Square Garden18,793
| 1–1
|- align="center" bgcolor="#ffcccc"
| 3
| April 28
| New York
| L 87–90 (OT)
| John Salley (20)
| Dennis Rodman (14)
| Isiah Thomas (11)
| The Palace of Auburn Hills21,454
| 2–1
|- align="center" bgcolor="#ccffcc"
| 4
| May 1
| New York
| W 86–82
| Joe Dumars (23)
| Dennis Rodman (17)
| Isiah Thomas (12)
| The Palace of Auburn Hills21,454
| 2–2
|- align="center" bgcolor="#ffcccc"
| 5
| May 3
| @ New York
| L 87–94
| Isiah Thomas (31)
| Isiah Thomas (10)
| Isiah Thomas (6)
| Madison Square Garden19,135
| 3–2
|-

Player statistics

Season

Playoffs

Awards and records
Dennis Rodman, All-NBA Third Team
Joe Dumars, NBA All-Defensive First Team
Dennis Rodman, NBA All-Defensive First Team

Transactions

See also
1991–92 NBA season

References

Detroit Pistons seasons
Detroit
Detroit
Detroit